The list of Hofstra University people includes notable graduates, professors, and administrators affiliated with Hofstra University.

Academia 
David B. Allison, class of 1987, Distinguished Professor, Quetelet Endowed Professor of Public Health, UAB
Steven Feld, class of 1971, anthropologist and ethnomusicologist
Jonathan D. Moreno, BA 1973, professor at the University of Pennsylvania; Senior Fellow at the Center for American Progress; author
Sharon Oster, BA 1970, Professor of Management and Entrepreneurship at Yale School of Management.
Tina Park, trustee, Los Angeles Community College District
Brandon 'Scoop B' Robinson, visiting professor New Jersey Institute of Technology
Victor Ricciardi B.B.A. 1991, professor of business and author
Steve Salbu (BA), dean emeritus of the Scheller College of Business at the Georgia Institute of Technology (2006-2014)
Morton O. Schapiro, President of Northwestern University
Robert Swirsky, author, lecturer, and computer scientist

Business
Chris Albrecht, former president and CEO of Starz, LLC; former chairman of HBO
Avi Arad, 1972, CEO of Marvel Studios
Diane Garnick, investment manager, author 
Gerald Guterman (attended), real estate investor and developer; Chairman and CEO of Guterman Partners, LLC
Charles Kushner, J.D. 1979, billionaire real estate developer; founder and co-owner of Kushner Properties
Ralph S. Larsen, B.B.A. 1962, chief executive officer of Johnson & Johnson from 1989 to 2002
Bernie Madoff, B.S. 1960, Wall Street investor convicted of multiple felonies related to the largest Ponzi scheme in history
Richard W. Lewis, B.A., 1973, author, ABSOLUT BOOK: The Absolut Vodka Advertising Story
Kathryn V. Marinello, M.B.A, Chairman, CEO, and a Director of the Company for Stream Global Services
Shawn Matthews, M.B.A., CEO of Cantor Fitzgerald & Co.
Robert McMahon, suspect in the 1978 Lufthansa heist
James C. Metzger, 1983, Chairman and CEO of The Whitmore Group, Ltd.
Tommy Mottola, former Chairman and CEO of Sony Music Entertainment; attended but did not graduate
Scott Ross, BS-1974, founder, Chairman, and CEO of Digital Domain, Inc.
Steven C. Witkoff, J.D., real estate investor; founder of The Witkoff Group, LLC
Frank G. Zarb, former chairman of NASD, Inc. and the Nasdaq Stock Market; current chairman of insurer AIG

Government, law and politics
Taylor Darling, Member of the  New York State Assembly
Luis R. Sepulveda, Member of the New York State Senate, former Member of the New York State Assembly
Maryanne Trump Barry, U.S. Court of Appeals Judge
Joseph Borg, J.D., Securities Commissioner of Alabama
Jon Bramnick, J.D., represents District 21 in the New Jersey General Assembly
Norm Coleman, former U.S. Senator (R-Minnesota)
Thomas DiNapoli, 1976, former New York state assemblyman; current New York State Comptroller
Lenora Fulani, first woman and first African American to appear on the ballot for U.S. President in all 50 states
Owen H. Johnson, BA 1956, Honorary JD '98, New York State Senator (R)
Peter S. Kalikow, MTA chairman
Norm Kent, BA 1971, attorney, publisher, (South Florida Gay News) radio talk show host, (Norm Kent Show     ) of National Organization for the Reform of Marijuana Laws (NORML)
Jeff Korek, New York City-based trial lawyer; partner at Gersowitz Libo & Korek, a personal injury law firm
Ron Kovic, activist, paraplegic, author of Born on the Fourth of July
Norman F. Lent, former U.S. Congressman, New York (R)
David A. Levy, former U.S. Congressman, New York (R)
Ed Mangano, Republican, Nassau County, NY County Executive
Joseph Margiotta, former Nassau County, Long Island Republican chairman
Mary Matalin, political consultant for the Republican Party; advisor to President George W. Bush and Vice President Dick Cheney (attended but did not graduate)
Richard McCormack, BA 1970, member of the Vermont Senate
Thomas McKevitt, BS, JD, represents District 17 in the New York State Assembly, which includes large portions of Nassau County
Joseph Mondello, BA 1962, Chairman, Nassau County (NY) Republican Committee
Robert O. Muller, JD 1974, co-founder of International Campaign to Ban Landmines, the Nobel Peace Prize winner in 1997
Callistus Ndlovu, Zimbabwean politician; taught history and politician science at Hofstra between 1969 and 1980
David Paterson, Governor of New York; former minority leader of the New York State Senate; first African American governor of NY
Kathleen Riebe, member of the Utah State Senate
Vincent Sapienza, former Commissioner of the New York City Department of Environmental Protection
Howard Safir, former New York City Police commissioner; former head of the United States Marshals Service
Peter J. Schmitt, County Legislator of Nassau County, New York's 12th District
Richard Socarides, J.D., Head of Public Affairs for Gerson Lehrman Group, former White House advisor
Thomas C. Wales, assassinated federal prosecutor

Film, theater, television, and radio
Scott Aharoni, film producer director and writer; Bardo, The Untimely Gift
Avi Arad, film producer; founder of Marvel Studios; producer of the Spider-Man and X-Men films
Brian Barry, SAG actor, X-Files, I Am Legend
James Caan (attended), actor, The Godfather
Godfrey Cambridge (attended), actor, comedian, Watermelon Man
Ryan Colucci, film producer, director and writer; Battle for Terra, Suburban Cowboy, With You, Orient City: Ronin & The Princess
Francis Ford Coppola, Academy Award-winning director, producer and writer of classics including The Godfather, The Godfather Part II, Apocalypse Now, Patton, The Outsiders, American Graffiti
Peter Dante, played Lacrosse at Hofstra; actor; The Waterboy, Big Daddy, Grandma's Boy
Robert Davi, actor; Licence to Kill, Die Hard, The Goonies, Wiseguy
Rosemarie DeWitt, actress; granddaughter of James Braddock
Adam Green, filmmaker, writer, director; Hatchet, Spiral, and Frozen
Steven Haft, film producer and later senior executive at AOL and Time Inc
Rashad Haughton, writer, film director, actor, screenwriter, and older brother of singer, actress and model Aaliyah.
Madeline Kahn, Tony Award winner for Best Actress, The Sisters Rosensweig; twice nominated for an Academy Award; Paper Moon, Blazing Saddles, Young Frankenstein, High Anxiety
Lainie Kazan, actress, starred in My Big Fat Greek Wedding
Francis Kenny, cinematographer, 2012 ASC Presidents Award
Dennis Latos, film producer director and writer; Bardo, The Untimely Gift
Frederic Lebow, screenwriter, While You Were Sleeping
Joe Morton, actor, Terminator 2, American Gangster
Andrew Rea, YouTuber and filmmaker, Binging with Babish
Scott Ross, producer; executive; founder of Digital Domain; General Manager of Industrial Light and Magic
Mike Starr, screen and stage actor; Goodfellas, Dumb and Dumber, Summer of Sam, The Natural, The Bodyguard, The Black Dahlia
Christopher Walken, attended as a dance student but did not graduate; Academy Award-winning actor
Alan Colmes, talk radio host; co-host of Fox News Channel's Hannity and Colmes
Brandon 'Scoop B' Robinson, NBA Columnist, host MSG Networks, CBS Sports Radio 
John DeBella, disc jockey, WMGK Philadelphia
Steven Epstein, Sony Classical music producer
Joe Frank, radio monologuist and playwright
Lisa Glasberg, "Lisa G", radio and TV personality, The Howard Stern Show
Ellie Greenwich, songwriter, "Leader of the Pack", "Be My Baby", "Chapel Of Love"
Dan Ingram, disc jockey, WCBS-FM, New York
Norm Kent, BA 1971, attorney, publisher, radio talk show host, WFTL
Lou Berger, 1972, head writer for children's television show Sesame Street; winner of 10 Emmys for outstanding writing
Clifford Chapin, voice actor
Margaret Colin, actress
Alan Colmes, talk radio host, former co-host of Fox News Channel's Hannity & Colmes
Brandon 'Scoop B' Robinson, MSNBC, MSG Networks
Elizabeth Dennehy, actress
Meredith Eaton-Gilden, actress and psychologist
Monica Horan, actress, Everybody Loves Raymond
Donnie Klang, solo artist, Making the Band 4
Stewart Mead, actor and former airline pilot
Tom McGowan, actor
Katie Nolan, sports personality and television host
Lisa Ortiz, voice actress, The Slayers, Pokémon, Sonic X
Matt Pieper, B.A. 2005, news anchor and reporter at News 12 The Bronx/Brooklyn in NYC
Philip Rosenthal, creator, producer and writer, Everybody Loves Raymond
Leslie Segrete, designer on TLC's While You Were Out and Trading Spaces
Joey Styles, play by play announcer for Extreme Championship Wrestling and World Wrestling Entertainment
Susan Sullivan, actress
Eliot Wald, B.A. 1967, television and film writer
Jay Wallace (journalist), President of Fox News
James Stacy Barbour, actor
Peter Friedman, actor
Anthony Ingrassia, playwright, producer and director
Charles Ludlam, playwright
Susan H. Schulman, theater director
Anwar Robinson, American Idol Top 10 Finalist

Art, literature, and print media
Gene Demby, journalist,  reporter at NPR and host of the Code Switch podcast
Nelson DeMille, author
Stephen Dunn, Pulitzer Prize for poetry, 2001; former varsity basketball player
Brandon 'Scoop B' Robinson, sportswriter for CBS
Marilyn French, feminist, author of The Women's Room
Pamela Geller, blogger, author, political activist, and commentator
Patricia Reilly Giff, children's literature author, teacher
Charlie Kadau, Senior Editor, Mad Magazine
Donald S. Kellermann, journalist and opinion researcher
Laurie Rozakis, writer of the Complete Idiots books
Bob Rozakis, writer, editor, Director of Production at DC Comics
Michelle Sakhai, painter
Ron Shandler, national baseball analyst, writer
Maryann Ridini Spencer, award-winning author, TV/Film screenwriter/producer, lifestyle journalist, and television host 
George Vecsey, sportswriter for The New York Times
Frank Nappi, author of "The Legend of Mickey Tussler" series and other novels 
Jean Butler, dancer and choreographer
August Darnell, aka Kid Creole, co-founder of Dr. Buzzard's Original Savannah Band, and later, Kid Creole and the Coconuts
Madeline Kahn, Broadway Tony Award winner; appeared in television shows and movies including Blazing Saddles and High Anxiety
Larry Keigwin, dancer and choreographer; choreographed Broadway's If/Then
Olivia, R&B singer
Robert Phillips, classical guitarist

Military 
Charles W. Dryden, Lieutenant Colonel and Tuskegee Airmen in World War II; Congressional Gold Medal

Technology 

 Jeff Pulver, internet entrepreneur
 Lance Ulanoff, former editor-in-chief of PCMag

Other 

 Kira Kazantsev, Miss America 2015; majored in political science, global studies and geography
 Michael Franzese (attended), former Mafia Captain in the Colombo crime family

Sports

Baseball
Randy Levine, Hofstra Law School, 1980; Senior Counsel at Akin Gump Strauss Hauer and Feld, LLP; President of the New York Yankees
Ken Singleton, former New York Mets, Montreal Expos, and Baltimore Orioles player; current YES Network commentator (did not graduate)
 Don Taussig (born 1932), Major League Baseball player

Basketball

 Kenny Adeleke (born 1983), Nigerian basketball player
Rick Apodaca, Puerto Rican professional basketball player who has played in the NCAA, USBL, NBDL, and the National Superior Basketball League of Puerto Rico
Speedy Claxton, Golden State Warriors point guard
 Jimmy Hall (born 1994), basketball player in the Israeli National League.
John Irving, led the nation in rebounding in NCAA Div 1, picked for NBA by Detroit; one of two Hofstra players with 1,000 pts AND 1,000 rebounds
 Charles Jenkins, Philadelphia 76ers guard
 Bob McKillop, 1972, men's head basketball coach, Davidson College
 Nat Militzok, New York Knicks forward
 Steve Nisenson, holder of Hofstra all-time scoring record for 43 years
 Norman Richardson
 Loren Stokes, NBA free agent
 Zeke Upshaw, NBA G League player

Football
Charlie Adams, wide receiver for the Houston Texans
Kyle Arrington, New England Patriots cornerback
Stephen Bowen, defensive end, Dallas Cowboys
Rocky Butler, quarterback for the Toronto Argonauts
Giovanni Carmazzi, former professional quarterback, drafted 65th in 2000 by San Francisco 49ers, but never took a regular season NFL snap
Wayne Chrebet, former New York Jets wide receiver
Brian Clark, linebacker
Willie Colon, Pittsburgh Steelers offensive line
Marques Colston, wide receiver for the New Orleans Saints
Mike D'Amato, NFL defensive back, Oakland and New York Jets; Super Bowl III winner; Lacrosse All-American for Hofstra; only person to be All-American in lacrosse and win a Super Bowl
 Jordan Dangerfield (born 1990), NFL football player
Devale Ellis, wide receiver for the Detroit Lions
Dave Fiore, former San Francisco 49ers and Washington Redskins guard
Don Gault, quarterback, Cleveland Browns
DeMingo Graham, former offensive lineman for the San Diego Chargers Houston Texans
Arlen Harris, running back and kick returner for the Atlanta Falcons
Raheem Morris, BS Physical Education 1997, former head coach of the Tampa Bay Buccaneers
John Schmitt, center, played for 10 years with the New York Jets and one year with the Green Bay Packers; member of New York Jets Super Bowl III Championship Team
Lance Schulters, free safety for the Miami Dolphins
Renauld Williams, former linebacker for the San Francisco 49ers

Ice hockey
Jon Cooper, head coach, Tampa Bay Lightning

Lacrosse
Athan Iannucci, midfielder, Philadelphia Wings, Chicago Machine and New Westminster Salmonbellies
Blake Miller, midfielder, Long Island Lizards
Nicky Polanco, Long Island Lizards
Doug Shanahan, midfield, Chicago Machine

MMA
Phil Baroni (attended), two-time Junior College All-American wrestler; former UFC fighter; current mixed martial artist
Jay Hieron, Junior College Champion wrestler; retired MMA fighter
Gian Villante, Hofstra Pride wrestler and football player; current MMA fighter in the UFC's Light Heavyweight Division
Chris Weidman, two-time NCAA D-1 All-American wrestler, 3rd 2008 NCAA Wrestling Championships, and former UFC Middleweight Champion

Soccer
Danny Elliott, striker, played for Hofstra Pride before moving to back to England to play for Port Vale and Hartlepool United. Also played in Spain for San Cristóbal

Faculty 
Yousef Al-Abed, Professor of Molecular Medicine
Lance Becker, Professor of Emergency Medicine
Peter B. Berger, Professor of Cardiology
Herman A. Berliner, Provost; Senior Vice President for Academic Affairs; Dean of Faculties; Lawrence Herbert Distinguished Professor 
David Jung-Kuang Chiu, former professor; Dean of University Advisement; Director of Asian Studies
Joel Block, Clinical Assistant Professor of Psychiatry
Barbara A. Cornblatt, Professor of Psychiatry
Stephen Dolgin, Professor of Surgery
Silvia Federici, Autonomist Marxist-feminist 
Jay Fiedler (born 1971), NFL football quarterback, as Hofstra receivers coach in 1997
Michael J. Freeman, professor
 Monroe Freedman, Lichtenstein Distinguished Professor of Legal Ethics; former HLS Dean (1973–77); author of Lawyers' Ethics in an Adversarial System (1975), the seminal work on lawyer-client privilege
Robert W. Greene (1929-2008), Pulitzer Prize-winning journalist, professor of journalism and mass media studies
Gary Gruber, professor, author, testing expert, physicist, educator
Tammy Hensrud, opera singer and adjunct professor of voice
Martha Hollander, professor, art historian, and poet 
Sina Y. Rabbany, professor of engineering; Dean of the Fred DeMatteis School of Engineering and Applied Science
Barbara Patton, assistant professor of Accounting, Taxation and Legal Studies in Business at Frank G. Zarb School of Business since 2002
Harvey J. Levin, former University Research Professor, first holder of Augustus B. Weller Chair in Economics, communications economics author and government consultant
Thomas G. McGinn, Professor of Medicine
Leonid Poretsky, Professor of Medicine
Jesse Roth, Clinical Professor of Molecular Medicine
David B. Samadi—Professor of urology
Robert Sobel, professor and author 
Kevin J. Tracey, Professor of Molecular Medicine
 Aaron Twerski (born 1939), the Irwin and Jill Cohen Professor of Law at Brooklyn Law School, as well as a former Dean and professor of tort law at Hofstra University School of Law
David Langer (neurosurgeon) -  Professor of neurosurgery and radiology

References

 
Hofstra